James Campbell "Jamie" Irwin (16 April 1937 – 4 November 2005) was an Australian politician. He was a Liberal member of the South Australian Legislative Council from 1985 to 2002. From 1997 to 2002 he was President of the Council.

References

 

1937 births
2005 deaths
Liberal Party of Australia members of the Parliament of South Australia
Members of the South Australian Legislative Council
Presidents of the South Australian Legislative Council
Place of birth missing
20th-century Australian politicians
21st-century Australian politicians